Richard John Hemingway (1938-2017), was a male swimmer who competed for England.

Swimming career
He represented England, finishing fourth and just outside of the medals in the 220 yards breaststroke at the 1958 British Empire and Commonwealth Games in Cardiff, Wales.

He swam for Roundhay Club.

References

1938 births
2017 deaths
English male swimmers
Swimmers at the 1958 British Empire and Commonwealth Games
Commonwealth Games competitors for England